Bestia is an Italian card game.  It is a gambling game and is similar to Briscola and Tressette. The word bestia means beast.

The game of the Beast was invented in France in the eighteenth century. It is described in the book "Académie Universelle des Jeux" - Paris 1739, which is available online, at pages. 255 et seq. The first mention of Bestia comes from Italian Raffaele Bisteghi, in his play "The practical", Bologna 1753. The eighteenth century version was somewhat different from today's version.

References

External links
Rules of Bestia

18th-century card games
Italian card games
Rams group